Be Good Johnny is an Australian born Standardbred pacer trained, owned and driven by John McCarthy of Logan Village, Queensland. He started his career later than most at age 5 coming second in a trial at Albion Park on 17 February 2004. His first win came in his next race 2 March 2004 in a C0 to C1 heat over 2,138 metres at Albion Park. The horse went on to win 24 of its first 27 starts, half of which were driven by John's son - Luke McCarthy.

Be Good Johnny stepped up to higher class races in the middle of 2005 just as the Australian harness season was about to begin in Queensland. Wins including the Red October Final, Seymour Charity Cup Final as well as placings in the Albion Park Final (2nd to Home of Jack), Sunshine Sprint (2nd to Cobbity Classic), Gold Coast Cup (2nd to Double Identity in a track record 1:53.5) and the Queensland Pacing Championship (3rd after galloping at the start).

Against quality fields Be Good Johnny had proven himself worthy of better things to come. Running a track record mile rate (1:56.2) at Albion Park for the 2680m gave him his first Grand Circuit win in the 2005 Trans-Tasman Cup. Be Good Johnny fought off the last-lap challenge of New South Wales pacer Dinki Di. Be Good Johnny made his first trip interstate for the Australasian Grand Circuit winning the 2005 Miracle Mile Pace and Victoria Cup. His tiredness from a season of rising through the ranks of Australian pacing showed by finishing 8th in the Interdominion held in Tasmania.

Be Good Johnny came back from a spell after the Interdominion in October 2006, winning the Gold Coast Cup in a mile rate of 1:54.0 (the best by any pacer in Australia this year). He went on to defend the title of the Miracle Mile Pace, making him just the sixth horse to achieve the feat (the last being Sokyola). The horse failed to place in the Victoria Cup and 2007 Interdominion final held at Globe Derby.

Be Good Johnny claimed his second Trans-Tasman in May, 2008. Injury kept him out of the bulk of the 2008/09 season, but he returned to racing in July, 2009. His form since then has been moderate..

Big race wins
 Miracle Mile Pace (2005, 2006)

References

Standardbred racehorses bred in Australia
Miracle Mile winners
1999 racehorse births